The men's 4 x 100 metres relay event at the 2003 European Athletics U23 Championships was held in Bydgoszcz, Poland, at Zawisza Stadion on 19 and 20 July.

Medalists

Results

Final
20 July

Heats
19 July
Qualified: first 3 in each heat and 2 best to the Final

Heat 1

Heat 2

Participation
According to an unofficial count, 49 athletes from 11 countries participated in the event.

 (4)
 (4)
 (4)
 (5)
 (4)
 (5)
 (5)
 (4)
 (5)
 (4)
 (5)

References

4 x 100 metres relay
Relays at the European Athletics U23 Championships